Jazz Suite on the Mass Texts is an album by Paul Horn which was composed and conducted by Lalo Schifrin and originally released on the RCA Victor label in 1965.

Reception

AllMusic awarded the album 3 stars stating: "The music here is a reflection of the church, using a broader base of textures and colors in jazz. The dynamics are powerful in this performance, and the communication between Horn's quintet, the orchestra led by Lalo Schifrin, and the chorus is undeniably magical. Certainly much of the record can be found leading into the realm of experimental music, and the critical listener should not be so critical, but rather sit, enjoy, and open their mind and listening senses".

Track listing
All compositions by Lalo Schifrin
 "Kyrie" - 4:13
 "Interludium" - 2:35
 "Gloria" - 6:03
 "Credo" - 3:02
 "Sanctus" - 2:41
 "Prayer" - 1:45
 "Offertory" - 4:35
 "Agnus Dei" - 4:04

Personnel
Paul Horn - alto saxophone, flute, alto flute, clarinet
Conte Candoli, Al Porcino - trumpet
Frank Rosolino - trombone
Dick Leith - bass trombone
Vincent DeRosa - French horn
Red Callender - tuba
Dorothy Remsen, Ann Stockton - harp
Lynn Blessing - vibraphone
Michael Lang - piano
Bill Plummer - bass
Larry Bunker - drums
Frank Flynn, Milt Holland, Emil Richards, Ken Watson - percussion
Betty Allen, Evangeline Carmichael, William Cole, Loulie Jean Norman, Marilyn Powell, Vern Rowe, Sara Jane Tallman, Marie Vernon - choir
Lalo Schifrin - arranger, conductor

References

Paul Horn (musician) albums
Lalo Schifrin albums
1965 albums
Albums arranged by Lalo Schifrin
Albums produced by Al Schmitt
RCA Victor albums